Vulpe is a Romanian surname meaning "fox". It may refer to:

People 

 Alexandru Vulpe (1931-2016), Romanian historian and archaeologist
 Michel Vulpe (born 1952), CEO of i4i
 Nicodim (Vulpe) (born 1956), a bishop of the Moldovan Orthodox Church

See also
 Vulpe Church, Romanian Orthodox church in Romania

Romanian-language surnames